The 1987 United Kingdom general election in Northern Ireland was held on 11 June with 17 MPs elected in single-seat constituencies using first-past-the-post as part of the wider general election in the United Kingdom. 1,090,389 people were eligible to vote, up 40,253 from the 1983 general election. 67.41% of eligible voters turned out, down 5.9 percentage points from the last general election.

Results
The Conservative Party led by Margaret Thatcher as prime minister won another term in government.

MPs elected

By-elections

References

Northern Ireland
1983
1987 elections in Northern Ireland